Swimming competitions at the 2015 Pan American Games in Toronto will be held from July 14 to 18 at the Toronto Pan Am Sports Centre (CIBC Pan Am/Parapan Am Aquatics Centre and Field House). Due to naming rights the arena will be known as the latter for the duration of the games. Due to Pan American Games being scheduled to be held roughly around the same time as the 2015 World Aquatics Championships scheduled for Kazan, Russia, the swimming events were condensed into a five-day schedule.

Format
The competition will feature 32 long course (50m) events, divided evenly between males and females into the following 16 events:
freestyle: 50, 100, 200, 400, 800 (females only) and 1500 (males only);
backstroke: 100 and 200;
breaststroke: 100 and 200;
butterfly: 100 and 200;
individual medley (I.M.): 200 and 400;
relays: 4x100 free, 4x200 free and 4x100 medley.
There will also be two open water swim events (one each for men and women) over 10 km.

Competition schedule

The following is the competition schedule for the swimming competitions:

Medal summary

Medal standings

Men's events

* Swimmers who participated in the heats only and received medals.

Women's events

* Swimmers who swam in preliminary heats and received medals.

Participating nations
A total of 37 countries qualified 312 swimmers. The number of athletes a nation entered is in parentheses beside the name of the country.
Pool 

Open water

Qualification

As with previous editions of the Games, A/B qualifying times will be used, with a target number of 276 swimmers. Times need to be swum in an approved meet sometime between January 1, 2014 and April 15, 2015. A total of 36 open water swimmers will also qualify (18 per gender).

References

 
Events at the 2015 Pan American Games
Swimming at the Pan American Games
Pan American Games